Armur Assembly constituency is a constituency of Telangana Legislative Assembly, India. It is one of 5 constituencies in Nizamabad district. It is part of Nizamabad Lok Sabha constituency.

Asannagari Jeevan Reddy of Telangana Rashtra Samithi is the current MLA of the constituency.

Mandals
The Assembly Constituency presently comprises the following Mandals:

Members of Legislative Assembly

Election results

Telangana

2018

2014

Andhra Pradesh

2009

See also
 List of constituencies of Telangana Legislative Assembly

References

Assembly constituencies of Telangana
Nizamabad district